Callistus Valentine Onaga, D.D., (b. September 29, 1958) is the fifth Roman Catholic Bishop of the Diocese of Enugu.

Early life and pastoral appointments

Callistus Valentine Onaga is the fifth child of Vincent and Victoria Onaga. His mother was the daughter of Tribal Chief Chukwuani of Ozalla Nkanu. Onaga attended St Anthony’s Primary School, Agbudu, Nigeria, from 1964 to 1972. He received his secondary education at the Sacred Heart Seminary in Nsude, Nigeria, from 1973 to 1975. He earned his Bachelor of Divinity degree in sacred theology from the Urban University in Rome in 1987, and was ordained to the priesthood on August 8, 1987. Within the diocese, Onaga held several positions, including pastor at St. Mary’s Church in Enugu, Vicar General, Administrator of Holy Ghost Cathedral, and committee chairman for the inauguration of the Diocese of Awgu.

Episcopal appointments

On February 9, 2009, Onaga was appointed by Pope Benedict XVI as the Enugu diocesan bishop after the resignation of Anthony Okonkwo Gbuji. He was ordained as the Bishop of Enugu on May 2, 2009, by Archbishop Renzo Fratini. His principal co-consecrators were Archbishop Valerian Okeke and Bishop Gbuji. Later that same day, Onaga appointed Monsignor Luke Adike as the diocesan Vicar General, and Very Rev. Fr. Ambrose Chineme Agu as the Diocesan Secretary and Chancellor.

Appointments
Onaga is a member of the Association of Episcopal Conferences of Anglophone West Africa as an ordinary. He is a member of the Catholic Bishops' Conference of Nigeria. At its first Plenary Meeting in 2009, this conference recognized his appointment as a diocesan bishop. As the diocesan bishop, Onaga is the legal holder of its microbank.

2010 visit to America
Onaga was the guest speaker for the Igbo Catholic Community USA (ICCUSA) Eighth Annual Convention between April 23 and 25, 2010, held in Sacramento, California.

References

Sources

 Catholic Diocese of Enugu www.catholicdioceseenugu.org Retrieved 2010-04-24. 
 The Hierarchy of the Catholic Church www.catholic-hierarchy.org Retrieved 2010-04-24.

1958 births
21st-century Roman Catholic bishops in Nigeria
Nigerian Roman Catholics
Roman Catholic bishops of Enugu
Living people